Eishin Preston (Japanese: エイシンプレストン, Chinese: 栄進寳蹄) (born April 9, 1997) is an American-bred Thoroughbred racehorse who competed in Japan and Hong Kong.

Sired by Green Dancer, 1991's leading sire in France and a son of English Triple Crown champion, Nijinsky, Eishin Preston's damsire Monteverdi was the son of Lyphard, who, like Nijinsky, was a son of Northern Dancer.

Eishin Preston won important graded stakes races in Japan under trainer Shuji Kitahashi. At  Kyoto Racecourse, he was second in the 2001 and 2002 Mile Championship. Sent to compete at Hong Kong's Sha Tin Racecourse, he won the 2001 Hong Kong Mile then came back in 2002 and 2003 to win back-to-back runnings of the Queen Elizabeth II Cup.

References
 Eishin Preston's pedigree and racing stats
 BBC Sport article  Repeat win for Eishin Preston
 Video at YouTube of Eishin Preston's win in the 2002 Queen Elizabeth II Cup

1997 racehorse births
Racehorses bred in Kentucky
Racehorses trained in Japan
Thoroughbred family 3